Christiane Weber or Christine Weber may refer to:

 Christiane Weber (fencer) (born 1962), German fencer
 Christiane Weber (rower), German rower
 Christine Weber (producer), see Women in Film & Video-DC Women of Vision Awards